"Twist in My Sobriety" is a song written and performed by British singer-songwriter Tanita Tikaram. Released as a single in October 1988 from her debut album, Ancient Heart (1988), it was Tikaram's biggest international success, achieving top-10 placings in several European countries. The song reached number two in both Austria and West Germany. Its music video was directed by Gerard de Thame and filmed in Bolivia.

Composition
Malcolm Messiter plays the oboe on the song, which is featured prominently on the song's chorus, as well as being used on instrumental solos throughout the song. The lyrics are written in three stanzas answered by the same refrain, with the refrain repeated twice at the end of the song. The refrain states: "Look my eyes are just holograms / Look your love has drawn red from my hands / From my hands you know you'll never be / More than twist in my sobriety". The first line of the song, "All God's children need travelling shoes", is the title of a book by writer and poet Maya Angelou.

Speaking about the somewhat obscure and enigmatic lyrics, Tikaram has offered different views on their meaning, but said it's mostly about the particular relationship with the world one feels when entering adulthood. "The song is really about not understanding - when you're 18, you've got a very particular emotional relationship with the world, you feel very isolated, and everybody else is so distant and cold. And I think I was singing about not feeling anything or not being moved by things around. I think this is a strong feeling when you're just after adolescence."

Release and performance
Released as the second single from her debut album Ancient Heart, the song was edited for its single release, eliminating the last verse of the song. Despite heavy promotion, including two performances of the song on the BBC's Top of the Pops, the single was only a moderate hit in the UK, peaking at number 22, and is Tikaram's last top-40 hit in her home country.

The song was a bigger success when released in Europe, becoming a top-10 hit in several countries, including Ireland (number 10), France (number six), Norway (number six), West Germany (number two), and Austria (number two). The single was Tikaram's only chart hit on the US charts, peaking at number 25 on the Modern Rock Tracks chart.

Critical reception
Graeme Kay from Smash Hits wrote, "However this "newie" is not in the slightest bit similar [to "Good Tradition"], for it's a moody, slow moving tale of emotional turmoil that Tanita rasps out to the sound of her gently plucked guitar. It probably won't be quite as big a hit as her last one, but I suspect we shall be hearing a lot more from Ms Tikaram in years to come."

Music video
The sepia-colored music video for "Twist in My Sobriety" was directed by Gerard de Thame and premiered in the autumn of 1988. Shot on location on the Altiplano Plateau in Bolivia, the video shows various residents of a destitute village interacting with each other amidst their daily struggles. Interspersed throughout these scenes are shots of Tanita Tikaram singing in a darkened room with only one light shining on her face.

Remixes
In 1998, Tikaram issued another version of the song as a B-side to her single Stop Listening.

Track listings

Charts

Weekly charts

Year-end charts

Certifications

Legacy
In 1989, the song was covered by Liza Minnelli for her album Results (produced by Pet Shop Boys). In 1996, a remixed house version by Ramp (Simon Rogers and Shem McCauley) with a much faster tempo was included on the compilation The Best of Tanita Tikaram and was released as a single to promote the album. The single peaked at number 82 in the UK. In 2001, the song appeared on the soundtrack of the film Bandits. The song has been covered by such artists as Diana Ankudinova from Russia.

References

1988 singles
1988 songs
Song recordings produced by Rod Argent
Songs written by Tanita Tikaram
Tanita Tikaram songs
Warner Records singles